Kara-Shybak is a village in Osh Region of Kyrgyzstan. It is part of the Chong-Alay District. Its population was 240 in 2021.

References

External links 

 Satellite map at Maplandia.com

Populated places in Osh Region